Yehud, also known as Yehud Medinata or Yehud Medinta, was an administrative province of the Achaemenid Persian Empire in the region of Judea that functioned as a self-governing region under its local Jewish population. The province was a part of the Persian satrapy of Eber-Nari, and continued to exist for two centuries until its incorporation into the Hellenistic empires following the conquests of Alexander the Great.

The area of Persian Yehud corresponded to the previous Babylonian province of Yehud, which was formed after the fall of the Kingdom of Judah, the southern Israelite kingdom that had existed in the region prior to the Jewish–Babylonian War and subsequent Babylonian captivity. It had a considerably smaller population than that of the fallen kingdom. Yehud Medinata was the Aramaic-language name of the province, which was first introduced by the Babylonians during their governance of the same region prior to the Persian conquest in 539 BCE.

Attempt at matching biblical to historical chronology

There is no complete agreement on the chronology of the Babylonian and Persian periods: the following table is used in this article, but alternative dates for many events are plausible. That is especially true of the chronological sequence of Ezra and Nehemiah, with  stating that Ezra came to Jerusalem "in the seventh year of Artaxerxes the King," without specifying whether he was Artaxerxes I (465–424 BCE) or Artaxerxes II (404–358 BCE). The probable date for his mission is 458 BCE, but it is possible that it took place in 397 BCE.

Background

In the late-7th century BCE, Judah became a vassal-kingdom of the Neo-Babylonian Empire, but there were rival factions at the court in Jerusalem, some supporting loyalty to Babylon and others urging rebellion. In the early years of the 6th century BCE, despite the strong remonstrances of the prophet Jeremiah and others, the Judahite king Jehoiakim revolted against Nebuchadnezzar II. The revolt failed, and in 597 BCE, many Judahites, including the prophet Ezekiel, were exiled to Babylon. A few years later, Judah revolted yet again. In 589, Nebuchadnezzar again besieged Jerusalem, and many Jews fled to Moab, Ammon, Edom and other countries to seek refuge. The city fell after an 18-month siege and Nebuchadnezzar again pillaged and destroyed Jerusalem and burned the Temple. Thus, by 586 BCE, much of Judah was devastated, the royal family, the priesthood, and the scribes, the country's elite, were in exile in Babylon, and the former kingdom suffered a steep decline of both economy and population.

The former kingdom of Judah then became a Babylonian province Yehud, with Gedaliah, a native Judahite, as governor (or possibly ruling as a puppet king). According to Miller and Hayes, the province included the towns of Bethel in the north, Mizpah, Jericho in the east, Jerusalem, Beth-Zur in the west and En-Gedi in the south. The administrative centre of the province was Mizpah. On hearing of the appointment, the Jews that had taken refuge in surrounding countries returned to Judah. However, before long, Gedaliah was assassinated by a member of the former royal house, and the Babylonian garrison was killed, triggering a mass movement of refugees to Egypt. In Egypt, the refugees settled in Migdol, Tahpanhes, Noph, and Pathros, and Jeremiah went with them as moral guardian.

The numbers deported to Babylon or who made their way to Egypt and the remnant that remained in Yehud province and in surrounding countries are subject to academic debate. The Book of Jeremiah reports that a total of 4,600 were exiled to Babylon. To such numbers must be added those deported by Nebuchadnezzar in 597 BCE after the first siege to Jerusalem, when he deported the king of Judah, Jeconiah, and his court and other prominent citizens and craftsmen along with a sizable portion of the Jewish population of Judah, numbering about 10,000. The Book of Kings also suggests that it was 8,000.

History

Biblical version

In 539 BCE, Babylon fell to the Persians. That event is dated securely from non-biblical sources. In his first year (538 BCE), Cyrus the Great decreed that the deportees in Babylon could return to Yehud and rebuild the Temple. Led by Zerubbabel, 42,360 exiles returned to Yehud, where he and Jeshua the priest, although they were in fear of the "people of the land", re-instituted sacrifices.

According to Book of Ezra, Jeshua and Zerubbabel were frustrated in their efforts to rebuild the Temple by the enmity of the "people of the land" and the opposition of the governor of "Beyond-the-River" (the satrapy of which Yehud was a smaller unit). However, in the second year of Darius (520 BCE), Darius discovered the Decree of Cyrus in the archives and directed the satrap to support the work, which he did, and the Temple was completed in the sixth year of Darius (516/515 BCE).

The Book of Ezra dates Ezra's arrival in Jerusalem to the second year of Artaxerxes. Its position in the narrative implies that he was Artaxerxes I in which case the year was 458 BCE. Ezra, a scholar of the commandments of Yahweh, was commissioned by Artaxerxes to rebuild the Temple and enforce the laws of Moses in Beyond-the-River. Ezra led a large party of exiles back to Yehud, where he found that Jews had intermarried with the "peoples of the land" and immediately banned intermarriage.

In the 20th year of Artaxerxes (almost definitely Artaxerxes I, whose twentieth year was 445/444 BCE) Nehemiah, the cup-bearer to the king and in a high official post, was informed that the wall of Jerusalem had been destroyed and was granted permission to return to Jerusalem to rebuild it. He succeeded in doing so but encountered strong resistance from the "people of the land", the officials of Samaria (the province immediately to the north of Yehud, the former kingdom of Israel) and other provinces and peoples around Jerusalem.

In chapter 8, the Book of Nehemiah abruptly switches back to Ezra, apparently with no change in the chronology, but the year is not specified. The Book of Nehemiah says that Ezra gathered the Jews together to read and enforce the law (his original commission from Darius but put into effect only now, 14 years after his arrival). Ezra argued to the people that failure to keep the law had caused the Exile. The Jews then agreed to separate themselves from the "peoples of the land" (once again, intermarriage was banned), keep Sabbath and generally observe the Law.

Current scholarship

The Babylonians removed only a portion of the population of Jerusalem; of those exiles, only a small portion returned to Jerusalem (539) after the Persian conquest of Babylon, and did so over several decades. The population of Persian-period Jerusalem and the area was smaller than once believed, only a few thousands. Much of the literature which became the Hebrew bible was compiled during the Persian period, and Persian Yehud saw considerable conflict over the construction and function of the Temple and matters of cult (i.e., how God was to be worshiped). Persia controlled Yehud using the same methods it used in other colonies, and the bible reflects this, and Yehud's status as a Persian colony is crucial to understanding the society and literature of the period. The restoration of the Davidic kingdom under Persian royal patronage was clearly the project of the exile community in the early post-Exilic period. The returnees attempted to restore in Yehud the First Temple threefold leadership template of king (Sheshbazzar and Zerubbabel), high priest (Joshua, descended from the priestly line), and prophets (Haggai, Zechariah). However, by the middle of the next century, probably around 450 BCE, the kings and prophets had disappeared and only the high priest remained, joined by the scribe-sage (Ezra) and the appointed aristocrat-governor (Nehemiah). This new pattern provided the leadership model for Yehud for centuries to come.

Administration and demographics
Yehud was considerably smaller than the old kingdom of Judah, stretching from around Bethel in the north to about Hebron in the south (although Hebron itself was unpopulated throughout the Persian period), and from the Jordan River and Dead Sea in the east to, but not including, the Shephelah (the slopes between the Judean highlands and the coastal plains) in the west. After the destruction of Jerusalem the centre of gravity shifted northward to Benjamin; this region, once a part of the kingdom of Israel, was far more densely populated than Judah itself, and now held both the administrative capital, Mizpah, and the major religious centre of Bethel. Mizpah continued as the provincial capital for over a century. The position of Jerusalem before the administration moved back from Mizpah is not clear, but from 445 BCE onwards it was once more the main city of Yehud, with walls, a temple (the Second Temple) and other facilities needed to function as a provincial capital, including, from 420 BCE, a local mint striking silver coins. Nevertheless, Persian-era Jerusalem was tiny: about 1,500 inhabitants, even as low as 500 according to some estimates. It was the only true urban site in Yehud, the bulk of the province's population lived in small unwalled villages. This picture did not much change throughout the entire Persian period. The entire population of the province remained around 30,000. There is no sign in the archaeological record of massive inwards migration from Babylon, in contradiction to the biblical account where Zerubbabel's band of returning Israelite exiles alone numbered 42,360.

The Persians seem to have experimented with ruling Yehud as a client-kingdom, but this time under the descendants of Jehoiachin, who had kept his royal status even in captivity. Sheshbazzar, the governor of Yehud appointed by Cyrus in 538, was of Davidic origin, as was his successor (and nephew) Zerubbabel; Zerubbabel in turn was succeeded by his second son and then by his son-in-law, all of them hereditary Davidic governors of Yehud, a state of affairs that ended only around 500 BCE. This hypothesis—that Zerubbabel and his immediate successors represented a restoration of the Davidic kingdom under Persian overlordship—cannot be verified, but it would be in keeping with the situation in some other parts of the Persian Empire, such as Phoenicia.

The second and third pillars of the early period of Persian rule in Yehud, copying the pattern of the old Davidic kingdom destroyed by the Babylonians, were the institutions of High Priest and Prophet. Both are described and preserved in the Hebrew Bible in the histories of Ezra-Nehemiah-Chronicles and in the books of Zechariah, Haggai and Malachi, but by the mid-5th century BCE the prophets and Davidic kings had ended, leaving only the High Priest. The practical result was that after c.500 BCE Yehud became in practice a theocracy, ruled by a line of hereditary High Priests.

The governor of Yehud would have been charged primarily with keeping order and seeing that tribute was paid. He would have been assisted by various officials and a body of scribes, but there is no evidence that a popular "assembly" existed, and he would have had little discretion over his core duties. Evidence from seals and coins suggests that most, if not all, of the governors of Persian Yehud were Jewish, a situation which conforms with the general Persian practice of governing through local leaders.

Governors of Yehud Medinata

The succession order and dates of most of the governors of the Achemenid province of Yehud cannot be recreated with any degree of certainty. Coins, jar-stamp impressions, and seals from the period are giving us the names of Elnathan, Hananiah (?), Jehoezer, Ahzai and Urio, all of them Jewish names. Some of them must have served between Zerubbabel and Nehemiah. Bagoas the Persian (Bagohi or Bagoi in Persian) is known by this short form of several theophoric names that was often used for eunuchs. He is mentioned in the 5th-century Elephantine papyri, and must therefore have served after Nehemiah.

 Sheshbazzar (either identical with, or governor before Zerubbabel)
 Zerubbabel (second half of the sixth century BCE). Led the first wave of Jewish exiles back to Judea after the fall of Babylonian Empire to Cyrus the Great. His family, however, remained behind in Nehardea.
 Ezra ben Seraiah (mid-fifth or early fourth century BCE, depending on whether Artaxerxes I or II was king in his time), the subject of the Hebrew Bible's Book of Ezra.
 Nehemiah ben Hachaliah (second half of the fifth century BCE). Nehemiah is mentioned in the 5th-century Elephantine papyri.xxxx
Hezekiah (governor); Yehezqiyah or Hezekiah, identified as hphh, 'ha-pechah' (the governor), by the script on a coin type dated to the late fourth century, possibly around 335 BCE, one of which was found at Beth Zur The inscription is also rendered in English as "the governor Hezekiah".

Religion and community

There is a general consensus among biblical scholars that ancient Judah during the 9th and 8th centuries BCE was basically henotheistic or monolatrous, with Yahweh as a national god in the same way that surrounding nations each had their own national gods. Monotheistic themes arose as early as the 8th century, in opposition to Assyrian royal propaganda, which depicted the Assyrian king as "Lord of the Four Quarters" (the world), but the Exile broke the competing fertility, ancestor and other cults and allowed it to emerge as the dominant theology of Yehud. The minor gods or "sons of God" of the old pantheon now turned into a hierarchy of angels and demons in a process that continued to evolve throughout the time of Yehud and into the Hellenistic age.

Persian Zoroastrianism certainly influenced Judaism. Although the exact extent of that influence continues to be debated, they shared the concept of God as Creator, as the one who guarantees justice and as the God of heaven.  The experience of exile and restoration itself brought about a new world view in which Jerusalem and the House of David continued to be central ingredients, and the destruction of the Temple came to be regarded as a demonstration of Yahweh's strength.

Possibly the single most important development in the post-Exilic period was the promotion and eventual dominance of the idea and practice of Jewish exclusivity, the idea that the Jews (meaning descendants of Jacob, followers of the God of Israel and of the law of Moses) were or should be a race apart from all others. According to Levine, that was a new idea, originating with the party of the golah, those who returned from the Babylonian exile. In spite of the reforming ex-Babylonian golah leader, Nehemiah, refusing the request of the Yahweh-worshiping Samaritans to help rebuild the Temple, and Ezra's horror at learning that Yehudi Yahweh-worshipers were intermarrying with non-Yehudis (possibly even non Yahweh-worshipers), the relations with the Samaritans and other neighbours were, in fact, close and cordial. Comparison of Ezra-Nehemiah and Chronicles bears this out: Chronicles opens participation in Yahweh-worship to all twelve tribes and even to foreigners, but for Ezra-Nehemiah, "Israel" means the tribes of Judah and Benjamin alone as well as the holy tribe of Levi.

Despite Yehud being consistently monotheistic, some pockets of polytheistic Yahwism still appeared to exist in the Persian period: the Elephantine papyri (usually dated to the 5th century BCE) shows that a small community of Jews living in the Egyptian island of Elephantine, while being devout supporters of Yaweh, also venerated the Egyptian goddess Anat and even had their own temple in the island. Such community had probably been founded before the Babylonian Exile and had, therefore, remained immune to religious reforms in the mainland. While it appears that the Elephantine community had some contact with the Second Temple (as evidenced by the fact that they had written a letter to the High Priest Johanan of Jerusalem), the exact relationship between the two is currently unclear. Following the expulsion of the Persians from Egypt by Pharaoh Amyrtaeus (404 BCE), the Jewish temple in Elephantine was abandoned.

Literature and language
Scholars believe that in the Persian period the Torah assumed its final form, the history of ancient Israel and Judah contained in the books from Joshua to Kings was revised and completed and the older prophetic books were redacted.  New writing included the interpretation of older works, such as the Book of Chronicles, and genuinely original work including Ben Sira, Tobit, Judith, 1 Enoch and, much later, Maccabees. The literature from Ben Sira onwards is increasingly permeated with references to the Hebrew Bible  in the present form, suggesting the slow development of the idea of a body of "scripture" in the sense of authoritative writings.

One of the more important cultural shifts in the Persian period was the rise of Aramaic as the predominant language of Yehud and the Jewish diaspora. Originally spoken by the Aramaeans, it was adopted by the Persians and became the lingua franca of the empire, and already in the time of Ezra, it was necessary to have the Torah readings translated into Aramaic for them to be understood by Jews.

Only a small amount of Hebrew-written epigraphic material from the Persian period has survived, including some coins from Tell Jemmeh and Beth-zur using the Paleo-Hebrew script, two seal impressions on bullae from a cave in Wadi Daliyeh, a seal from Tell Michal, etc. In contrast, Aramaic-written epigraphic material is much more prevalent.

Archaeology 
Throughout the fourth century CE, the province of Yehud was home to a network of strongholds. One of these is Hurvat Eres, a little rectangular fort that was discovered atop Har HaRuach, north of Kiryat Ye'arim.

See also
 History of the Jews and Judaism in the Land of Israel
 Intertestamental period
 Jew (word)
 Judaea (Roman province)
 Nebuchadnezzar Chronicle or Jerusalem Chronicle, one of the Babylonian Chronicles containing details about Nebuchadnezzar's Siege of Jerusalem (597 BCE)
 Return to Zion
 Second Temple period
 Yehud coinage
 Zion

References

Notes

External links

Maps
 Yehud Medinata map, CET – Center For Educational technology
 Yehud Medinata Border map, CET – Center For Educational technology

Books
Becking, Bob, and Korpel, Marjo Christina Annette (eds), "The Crisis of Israelite Religion: Transformation of Religious Tradition in Exilic & Post-Exilic Times" (Brill, 1999)
Bedford, Peter Ross, "Temple restoration in early Achaemenid Judah" (Brill, 2001)
Berquist, Jon L., "Approaching Yehud: new approaches to the study of the Persian period" (Society of Biblical Literature, 2007)
Blenkinsopp, Joseph, "Judaism, the first phase: the place of Ezra and Nehemiah in the origins of Judaism" (Eerdmans, 2009)
Grabbe, Lester L., "A history of the Jews and Judaism in the Second Temple Period", vol.1 (T&T Clark International, 2004)
Levine, Lee I., "Jerusalem: portrait of the city in the second Temple period (538 B.C.E.-70 C.E.)" (Jewish Publication Society, 2002)
Lipschitz, Oded, "The Fall and Rise of Jerusalem" (Eisenbrauns, 2005)
Lipschitz, Oded, and Oeming, Manfred (eds), "Judah and the Judeans in the Persian period" (Eisenbrauns, 2006)
Lipschitz, Oded, and Oeming, Manfred (eds), "Judah and the Judeans in the fourth century B.C.E." (Eisenbrauns, 2006)
Middlemas, Jill Anne, "The troubles of templeless Judah" (Oxford University Press, 2005)
Stackert, Jeffrey, "Rewriting the Torah: literary revision in Deuteronomy and the holiness code" (Mohr Siebeck, 2007)
Nodet, Étienne, "A search for the origins of Judaism: from Joshua to the Mishnah" (Sheffield Academic Press, 1999, original edition Editions du Cerf, 1997)
Vanderkam, James, "An introduction to early Judaism" (Eerdmans, 2001)

Achaemenid satrapies
Autonomous administrative divisions
Ancient Israel and Judah
Ancient Jewish Persian history
Return to Zion
States and territories established in the 6th century BC
States and territories disestablished in the 4th century BC
539 BC
Political entities in the Land of Israel
Jewish Persian and Iranian history
6th-century BCE Judaism
5th-century BCE Judaism
4th-century BCE Judaism